Else Schmitz-Gohr (12 August 1901 – 13 December 1987) was a German composer, pianist, and teacher who is best remembered for her Elegy for the Left Hand for piano, her successful students, and her recordings of Max Reger’s works for piano.

Schmitz-Gohr was born in Cologne. She studied at the Cologne Conservatory and the Stern Conservatory in Berlin. Her teachers included Franz Bolsche, Wilhelm Klatte, Dr. Otto Klauwell, James Kwast, and Fritz Hans Rehbold. She socialized with sculptor Lili Graf. In 1918, she debuted as a pianist under conductor Hermann Abendroth, and in 1922 won the Gustav Hollaender medal. 

Schmitz-Gohr toured throughout Germany and abroad as a pianist. She was known for her interpretation of modern composers, especially Max Reger, whose works she recorded commercially on LP KAS 30067 (Kaskade). She taught at the Rheinische Musikschule, the State Academy of Music in Cologne, and the Stern Conservatory. Her students included Dietmar von Capitaine, Bernhard Klee, Aloys and Alfons Kontarsky, Georg Kroll, Irene Vogel Osiander, Erika Rademacher, Eckart Sellheim, and Joachim Volkmann.

Compositions 
Schmitz-Gohr's compositions were published by Schott Music. They included:

Chamber 
 Allegro in G minor (violin and piano)
 Allegro Moderato in E minor (piano trio)
 Andante in G minor (piano trio)
 Kleine Flöten-Duette (two flutes)

 Orchestra 
 Overture in G minor

 Piano 
 Elegy for the Left Hand Fantasie'' in F major
 Suite

References

Recordings
 
 

German women composers
German classical pianists
German music educators
1901 births
1987 deaths
People from Cologne